The 2022–23 season of the Oberliga is the 15th season of the Oberligas at tier five of the German football league system.

Tables

Baden-Württemberg

League table

Bayern Nord

League table

Bayern Süd

League table

Bremen

League table

Hamburg

League table

Hessen

League table

Mittelrhein

League table

Niederrhein

League table

Niedersachsen

League table

Nordost-Nord

League table

Nordost-Süd

League table

Rheinland-Pfalz/Saar

League table

Schleswig-Holstein

League table

Westfalen

League table

External links
 Fussball.de  Official results website of the German Football Association
 Weltfussball.de  German football results and tables
 Soccerway.com Oberliga tables and results

 
5
Germ